Villa Darwin is a village or populated centre in the Soriano Department of western Uruguay.

Geography
The rural area it is in, is known as Sacachispas. Its nearest populated place is the village of Palmar in an east-northeast direction.

Population
In 2011 Villa Darwin had a population of 456.
 
Source: Instituto Nacional de Estadística de Uruguay

References

External links
INE map of Villa Darwin

Populated places in the Soriano Department